Miroslav Vukašinović (born 29 August 1948) is a Serbian former football manager and player.

Playing career
Born in Užička Požega, Vukašinović started out at his hometown club Sloga. He later represented Sloboda Užice and Vojvodina, collecting over 100 appearances in the Yugoslav First League. After moving abroad in 1977, Vukašinović played for two Austrian clubs, LASK and Wiener Sport-Club.

Managerial career
In the late 1980s, Vukašinović was manager of the El Salvador national team. He later returned to his homeland and worked at Čukarički (2001–02), Vojvodina (2002–03), and ČSK Čelarevo (2005–06). Afterwards, Vukašinović served as manager of Voždovac for two months, before stepping down in April 2007. He then briefly managed Srem, before being hired by his former club Hajduk Kula in November 2007. In May 2008, Vukašinović announced his decision to retire at the end of the season, citing his dissatisfaction with the overall state of Serbian football as the main reason.

Honours
Vojvodina
 Mitropa Cup: 1976–77

References

External links
 

1948 births
Living people
People from Požega, Serbia
Yugoslav footballers
Serbian footballers
Association football midfielders
FK Sloboda Užice players
FK Vojvodina players
LASK players
Wiener Sport-Club players
Yugoslav Second League players
Yugoslav First League players
Austrian Football Bundesliga players
Yugoslav expatriate footballers
Expatriate footballers in Austria
Yugoslav expatriate sportspeople in Austria
Yugoslav football managers
Serbia and Montenegro football managers
Serbian football managers
El Salvador national football team managers
Kastoria F.C. managers
FK Smederevo managers
FK Hajduk Kula managers
FK Čukarički managers
FK Vojvodina managers
FK Voždovac managers
Serbian SuperLiga managers
Yugoslav expatriate football managers
Serbia and Montenegro expatriate football managers
Expatriate football managers in El Salvador
Expatriate football managers in Greece
Yugoslav expatriate sportspeople in El Salvador
Serbia and Montenegro expatriate sportspeople in Greece